The later homonym Vahlia Dahl is now known as Dombeya.

Vahlia is a genus of herbs and subshrubs that grow in Africa and the Indian subcontinent. There are at least five species.

The genus is placed alone in family Vahliaceae. This family had previously been placed in the Saxifragales order, and was reassigned to the new order Vahliales in 2016 by the APG IV system.

Species 

 Vahlia capensis (L. fil.) Thunb.; South Africa (Cape Prov.) 
 Vahlia dichotoma (J. A. Murr.) Kuntze, Mauritania, Algeria, Libya, Egypt, Western Sahara, Mali, Senegal, Gambia, Burkina Faso, Niger, Nigeria, Ghana, Benin, ?Togo, Central African Republic, Sudan, South Sudan, Uganda, Kenya, Tanzania, Zambia, Malawi, Mozambique, Chad, Zimbabwe, India, Sri Lanka 
 Vahlia digyna (Retz.) Kuntze   Egypt (Nile Valley), Pakistan (Baluchistan, Sind, Pakistani Punjab), NW-India, Botswana, Mauritania, Senegal, Mali, Burkina Faso, NE-Nigeria, Sudan, Ethiopia, Somalia, Kenya, Tanzania, Zambia, Zimbabwe, Guinea-Bissau, Chad, etc., Madagascar 
 Vahlia geminiflora (Del.) Bridson   Egypt (Nile Valley), Iran (S-Iran), Iraq (SE-Iraq: Mesopotamia), Mali, Niger, N-Nigeria, Sudan, South Sudan, Ethiopia, Eritrea, Mauritania 
 Vahlia somalensis Chiov., Somalia, Ethiopia, Kenya

References 

 http://www.mobot.org/MOBOT/Research/APweb/orders/gentianalesweb.htm#Vahliaceae

Asterids